O. nigricans may refer to:
 Onchidella nigricans, a small air-breathing sea slug species
 Oncometopia nigricans, a sharpshooter species in the genus Oncometopia found in North and South America

See also
 Nigricans (disambiguation)